Bon Tuman-e Seh (also Romanized as Bon Tūmān-e Seh and Bontūmān-e Seh) is a village in Mamulan Rural District, Mamulan District, Pol-e Dokhtar County, Lorestan Province, Iran. At the 2006 census, its population was 105, in 24 families.

References 

Towns and villages in Pol-e Dokhtar County